Bedhab Banarasi ('बेढ़ब' बनारसी) was a Hindi writer of the twentieth century, famous for his witty style of writing.

Bedhab's short stories narrate the turmoil in the life of the middle class of both cities and villages of Indian in the early- to mid-twentieth century.

References

1885 births
Year of death missing
Writers from Varanasi
Indian comedy writers
Indian male poets